Apple Pie are a Russian progressive rock band founded by Vartan Mkhitaryan in 2000. Their debut album, Crossroad, was released in 2007 by Russian rock label MALS.

Band Discography 

 Crossroad (2007)
 The Gates of Never (2013)

Band members 

 Vartan Mkhitaryan – vocals, guitars, keyboards
 Andrey Golodukhin – drums
 Maxim Zhdanov – bass, backing vocals

References 

Russian progressive rock groups
Russian art rock groups